The Chesapeake Bay Flotilla was a motley collection of barges and gunboats that the United States assembled under the command of Joshua Barney, an 1812 privateer captain, to stall British attacks in the Chesapeake Bay which came to be known as the "Chesapeake Campaign"  during the War of 1812. The Flotilla engaged the Royal Navy in several inconclusive battles before Barney was forced to scuttle the vessels themselves on August 22, 1814. The men of the Flotilla then served onshore in the defense of Washington, DC and Baltimore. It was disbanded on February 15, 1815, after the end of the war.

Formation
Joshua Barney submitted a plan for the defense of the Chesapeake Bay to Secretary of the Navy William Jones on 4 July 1813. He estimated that a force consisting of gunboats and barges that could be sailed or rowed, manned by sailors and those in the shipbuilding industries, could engage British landing parties in the shallow waters of the Bay. He set sail in April 1814 with these eighteen ships: seven  barges, six  barges, two gunboats, one row-galley, one lookout boat and his flagship, the  sloop-rigged, self-propelled floating battery USS Scorpion, mounting two long guns and two carronades.

Flotillamen crews

The Flotillamen, totaling 4,370 men at their largest, were motley crews composed mainly of U.S. Navy sailors, merchant seamen, Chesapeake Bay watermen, privateers, free negros, and runaway slaves.  Later, when they became shipless and on the march, from Benedict, Maryland, a battalion of 700 marines from the Washington Navy Yard, would join them, as they moved north to defend the Capital and make an abortive stand at Bladensburg, against the rapid British advance.

Operations

Battle of St. Jerome Creek
On June 1, 1814, Barney's flotilla, led by Scorpion, were coming down Chesapeake Bay when it encountered the 12-gun schooner  (the former Baltimore privateer Atlas), and boats from the 74-gun Third Rates  and  near St. Jerome Creek. The flotilla pursued St Lawrence and the boats until they reached the protection of the two 74s. The American flotilla then retreated into the Patuxent River, which the British quickly blockaded. The British outnumbered Barney by 7:1, forcing the flotilla on June 7 to retreat into St. Leonard's Creek. Two British frigates, the 38-gun Loire and the 32-gun , plus the 18-gun sloop-of-war , blockaded the mouth of the creek. The creek was too shallow for the British warships to enter; the flotilla outgunned, and hence was able to fend off, the boats from the British ships.

Battles continued through June 10. The British, frustrated by their inability to flush Barney out of his safe retreat, proceeded to raid several nearby Maryland settlements; sacking and burning Calverton, Huntingtown, Prince Frederick, Benedict and Lower Marlboro. Among the British units that participated in the campaign were a battalion of Royal Marines and the Corps of Colonial Marines, a unit consisting of enslaved African Americans who had deserted their enslavers and joined the British.

Battle of St. Leonard's Creek
On June 26, after the arrival of troops commanded by U.S. Army Colonel Decius Wadsworth, and U.S. Marine Captain Samuel Miller, Barney attempted a breakout. A simultaneous attack from land and sea on the blockading frigates at the mouth of St. Leonard's creek allowed the flotilla to move out of the creek and up-river to Benedict, Maryland, though Barney had to scuttle gunboats 137 and 138 in the creek. The British entered the then-abandoned creek and burned the town of St. Leonard, Maryland.

The British, under the command of Admiral Sir Alexander Cochrane, moved up the Patuxent, preparing for a landing at Benedict, Maryland. For several days the British fleet bombarded the Flotilla with cannon and congreve rockets in an attempt to destroy it. August 11, 1814, the Flotilla left St. Leonard's Creek and sailed north up the Patuxent River. A plan had been discussed to transport the entire Flotilla overland from the port of Queen Anne to the South River and return it to the Bay. However, concerned that the Flotilla would fall into British hands, Secretary of the Navy Jones ordered Barney to take his squadron as far up the Patuxent as possible, to Queen Anne, and scuttle the vessels should the British appear. On 22 August the British approached the Flotilla, and Barney ordered its destruction. He then force-marched the men from the flotilla and such cannons as were movable, to Washington D.C. where they were to join the Battle of Bladensburg.

Three active battalions of the Regular Army (1-4 Inf, 2-4 Inf and 3-4 Inf) perpetuate the lineages of the old 36th and 38th Infantry Regiments, both of which had elements that participated in the Battle of St. Leonard's Creek.

Battle of Queen Anne
On August 22, the British attempted to capture Barney's squadron at Queen Anne. In his report of the affair, the tactical commander, Admiral Sir George Cockburn wrote:

Battle of Bladensburg
On August 24, Barney and the flotilla participated in the Battle of Bladensburg. The Flotilla stood their ground and the British suffered heavy casualties at the hands of Barney's cannoneers. Barney received a serious wound to his thigh from a musket ball and since they were about to be overwhelmed by British regulars, ordered the Flotilla to retreat. The Flotilla, along with the United States Marines from the Marine Corps Barracks at 8th and I Streets in Washington, D.C., commanded by Lt. Miller, were the last two American units to leave the battlefield. The 1814 Register of Patients at the Naval Hospital Washington, provides a unique glimpse of the aftermath of battle and a record of the lives of individual sailors, marines, soldiers, and civilians many who were part of the Chesapeake Bay Flotilla, from their admission to discharge. The Register, covers the period 2 June to 30 December 1814, is one of our most important primary sources for the names and units of American casualties at Bladensburg, see thumbnail.

Battle of Baltimore
Approximately 500 of the flotilla men then marched to Baltimore, joining others there, and were assigned to the U.S. Naval Command Second Regiment. They manned the following posts in the defense of Baltimore:

The Flotilla manned these positions throughout the Battle of Baltimore, pitting sailor against sailor in fighting the British Fleet. The Flotilla inflicted numerous casualties on the attacking British ships, especially during the attempted night assault on Battery Babcock by a Royal Marine landing party. Lt. Col. David Harris reported that Charles Messenger was killed in action at the Water Battery, and three other flotilla men wounded.

Flotilla disbanded
After the Battle of Baltimore, the Flotilla did not participate in any further engagements. On February 15, 1815, Congress repealed the short lived Flotilla Act, and the Chesapeake Bay Flotilla was officially disbanded.

Archeology
In 1978, a survey of the upper Patuxent River using a proton precession magnetometer located the fleet. Further study of the wrecks, including one vessel dubbed the Turtle Shell Wreck', followed in 1979. The Turtle Shell was lying in the main river channel near Wayson's Corner, and covered by five feet of mud, the ship was well preserved, although it appeared the bow was torn off in an explosion.

When the new Route 4 Hills Bridge was built in 1990, remnants of Barney's ships were found buried more than five feet below the riverbed.

A replica of one of Joshua Barney's gunboats today sits at the Bladensburg Waterfront Park.

Honors

See also
Brown water navy
Small unit riverine craft
Special Boat Service
Special Operations Craft – Riverine (SOC-R)
Special warfare combatant-craft crewmen
River gunboat
United States Naval Special Warfare Command
Yangtze Patrol

References

External links
Joshua Barney's Chesapeake Bay Flotilla
The Road to Washington
The Scorpion - Dictionary of American Fighting Ships
Riverine Warfare: The U.S. Navy's Operations on Inland Waters

Chesapeake Bay
/
Chesapeake
Battles of the Chesapeake campaign